"Putin's Palace" is an Italianate palace complex located on the Black Sea coast near Gelendzhik, Krasnodar Krai, Russia.

The complex first came to public attention in 2010 after whistleblower Sergei Kolesnikov published an open letter to Russian president Dmitry Medvedev exposing the construction of the palace. Kolesnikov also stated that the undertaking was run by Nikolai Shamalov who was acting on behalf of Vladimir Putin. Alexander Ponomarenko was later reported to have ownership.

The complex drew more substantial public attention in 2021, when Russian opposition leader Alexei Navalny's Anti Corruption Foundation (FBK) released an investigative documentary film about it which detailed a corruption scheme allegedly headed by Putin and claimed that the palace was built for the president's personal use. The FBK investigation estimated the cost of the build to be over 100 billion rubles (US$956 million) at 2022 prices. Putin denied that the palace belonged to him, with the Kremlin saying that it is a private venture owned by various businessmen whose names cannot be revealed by the state. Following the release of the film, Arkady Rotenberg, who has close ties to Putin, claimed ownership of the palace.

Location and buildings

Cape Idokopas is a promontory on the Black Sea coast of Russia near Gelendzhik, Krasnodar Krai. The headland is lined with cliffs but is mostly flat on its summit, which is heavily forested with Turkish pine trees. It is bordered by a reef that makes offshore navigation hazardous. The airspace around the palace (see image) is regulated as Prohibited Special Use Airspace P116 (i.e. a no-fly zone), for which the Russian Federal Security Service (FSB) stated was to protect an FSB border-post in the area from increased foreign intelligence activity.

Inside the main building are a swimming pool, aquadiskotheque arrangement, spa, saunas, Turkish baths, meat and fish, vegetable and dessert shops, a warehouse, a reading room, a music lounge, a hookah bar, a theater and a cinema, a wine cellar, a casino, and about a dozen guest bedrooms.

The house is designed by the Italian architect Lanfranco Cirillo, who has designed properties for many of Russia's elite.

Ownership

Russian government official Vladimir Kozhin told reporters from the Russian daily Kommersant that the Russian government had approved the construction of the estate by the Lirus group, and that the government maintained a stake in the project until 2008, when it sold its share.

In March 2011, it was reported that Alexander Ponomarenko, a businessman and billionaire who made his money in sea ports, banking, commercial real estate and airport construction, acquired the company "Idokopas" which owned the palace. At the time of the purchase, Idokopas owned around 67 hectares of recreational land near the settlement of Praskoveyeka, including a guesthouse complex amounting to 26,000 square meters. Ponomarenko also said he had bought a second company, the Azure Berry Company, which owned 60 hectares of agricultural land near Divnomorsk, a settlement 13 kilometers from Praskoveyevka. Ponomarenko bought the unfinished complex from Shamalov and his partners. At the time of the purchase, Ponomarenko did not disclose the value of the deal, but hinted he had been able to purchase the property for a very good price – the asset was heavily encumbered with debts and the developers had run out of money to complete the project. When asked about the projected value of the complex once complete, he conceded that suggestions it could be as much as $350 million "were close to the truth". According to Vedomosti, however, experts estimated the value of the property at $20 million. In July 2011, the Azure Berry Company was sold to SVL Group, controlled by Boris Titov, the owner of champagne factory "Abrau-Durso". Ponomarenko's media representatives told Forbes in 2021 that Ponomarenko had withdrawn from the project in 2016.

On 11 May 2016, RBC reported that Alexei Vasilyuk through his ownership of the Moscow registered LLC “Southern citadel” has exclusive rights since 25 March 2016 to the water along the coastline between Cape Idokopas and Divnomorskoye for the production of mussels and oysters and that on 20 April 2016 “Southern citadel” has received a 25-year lease to two land plots totaling  along the Black Sea next to “Putin's Palace”. The RBC article also stated that Ponomarenko is the owner of “Putin's Palace” through his Complex LLC which is the owner of the land under “Putin's Palace” since May 2013 and the owner of the structure “Putin's Palace” since March 2015 and that the British Virgins Islands firm Savoyan Investments Limited has been the owner of Complex LLC since September 2013. According to a 13 May 2016 The Moscow Times article, the exclusive ownership of the nearby coastline is to prevent ships from approaching the coastline near “Putin's Palace”. On 3 March 2017, Alexander Ponomarenko obtained a 100% stake in “South Citadel” and thus obtained an additional two plots of land next to “Putin's Palace” and had the exclusive rights to the water along the coastline near “Putin's Palace”.

On 30 January 2021, the billionaire Arkady Rotenberg, who has close links to Putin, said that he had purchased the estate "a few years ago." He also said that the property when completed would become an apartment hotel.

Corruption claims

Kolesnikov letter
In 2010, Russian businessman Sergei Kolesnikov wrote an open letter to Dmitry Medvedev, at that time the Russian President, stating that a dentist named Nikolai Shamalov was building a grand Black Sea estate for Putin or Medvedev. Kolesnikov said the construction of the estate was draining funds available for his work, which included the state-commissioned renovations of hospitals in collaboration with Shamalov and businessman Dmitry Gorelov. Kolesnikov further said that he had worked on the estate project until he was removed because he voiced concerns about corruption, that the estate was still under construction, and the cost was one billion dollars, funded by bribery and theft.

In 2011, the Novaya Gazeta wrote that it had obtained a contract for the palace signed by the presidential property manager in 2005, when Putin was the Russian president. A website called the "Russian Wikileaks," RuLeaks.Ru, posted photographs of the estate, but could not confirm its ownership. Medvedev replied that neither he nor Putin had any relationship to the property.

Speaking to the BBC in 2012, Kolesnikov said that the estate was still under construction, and that the project was being organized sometimes by Shamalov, or sometimes by a deputy of the president, Igor Sechin. Kolesnikov said that Shamalov never questioned his role, adding, "There was a tsar - and there were slaves, who didn't have their own opinion." According to the BBC, the estate was owned by a company Shamalov partly owned, and it was unclear if Putin had any relationship to the property.

Financing claims

In Kolesnikov's initial letter and in subsequent media interviews, including to Novaya Gazeta, David Ignatius of The Washington Post and Masha Gessen of Snob.ru, he provided an account of how the construction of the estate was financed by corruption. Kolesnikov said that in early 2000, Nikolai Terentievich Shamalov, a representative of the multinational company Siemens AG in North West Russia and somebody thought close to Russia's new President Vladimir Putin, approached Kolesnikov with a business proposition. The two men had known each other through business since 1993–1994, when Kolesnikov was deputy director general of Petromed, a St. Petersburg-based firm that specialised in the procurement of medical supplies. It was also through Petromed that Kolesnikov had got to know Putin, on whose behalf Shamalov said he made the approach. Putin had been head of the St. Petersburg Council on External Economic affairs which when Petromed became a private company in 1992 held a 51% stake.

Kolesnikov told Masha Gessen that Putin held 94% of shares in Rosinvest, with Kolesnikov, Shamalov and Dmitry Vladimirovich Gorelov (director of Petromed and another friend of Putin from his time in Saint Petersburg) taking 2% each. Rosinvest's interests included shipbuilding, construction, and lumber/timber processing. Kolesnikov is reported as saying that Abramovich and the other donors to health projects acted 'nobly', implying they were unaware that a significant proportion of their donations was being diverted into an investment vehicle allegedly run for the benefit of the President and his partners in Rosinvest. This is despite the huge sums involved and disputed claims that the relationship between Putin and Abramovich has been very close.

The chart below shows the scheme of interaction between companies and cash flows involved in financing of the construction, according to Kolesnikov.

Investigations
In February 2011, members of the group "Environmental Watch for the North Caucasus" and a journalist visited the site to investigate concerns that the construction violated laws protecting the area's ecology. They said that they were harassed and detained by members of the Federal Protective Service (FSO), the agency responsible for guarding state property and high-ranking officials. Despite the confiscation of their equipment they were able to publish additional photographs of the site. Activists made another sortie into the property in June 2011, when they claimed to have found an illegally constructed marina.

RBC investigation 
The 11 May 2016 RBC article "Oyster farming will begin in front of the "Putin's palace" near Gelendzhik" revealed that Ponomarenko is the owner of "Putin's Palace". The publishing of the RBC article contributed to Mikhail Prokhorov, who has the majority ownership of the RBK Group after he purchased a 51% stake in it in 2009, to fire Maxim Solus, the editor-in-chief of RBC newspaper, which further resulted in the resignations of both Roman Badanin, rbc.ru's chief editor, and Yelizaveta Osetinskaya, RBC's chief editor.

FBK investigation 

On 19 January 2021, two days after Alexei Navalny was detained by Russian authorities upon his return to Russia, an investigation by him and his Anti-Corruption Foundation (FBK) was published accusing President Vladimir Putin of using fraudulently obtained funds to build the estate for himself in what he called "the world's biggest bribe." Navalny said that the estate is 39 times the size of Monaco and cost over 100 billion rubles ($1.35 billion) to construct. His video showed aerial footage of the estate via a drone and a detailed floorplan of the palace that Navalny said was given by a contractor, which he compared to photographs from inside the palace that were leaked onto the Internet in 2011. He also detailed an elaborate corruption scheme allegedly involving Putin's inner circle that allowed Putin to hide billions of dollars to build the estate.

After Navalny's arrest and the release of his video, protests in support of Navalny began on 23 January 2021. In response to the claims, Putin said that the palace had never belonged either to him or his family.

The BBC Russian Service spoke to several construction workers who said they worked on the palace between 2005 and 2020, confirming several of the allegations made in the FBK investigation, including that the palace was being rebuilt due to mould.

In January 2022, the FBK leaked 479 photographs of the palace while it was under construction. The photographs show the exterior and interior of the house including photographs of rooms that were described as a strip club and a hookah lounge.

Meduza investigation 
Journalists from the online newspaper Meduza interviewed people who were involved in the construction of the residence. Many interviewees said the residence is connected with Putin and is guarded by the FSO, who also supervise construction. Meduza had documents with the names and signatures of the FSO employees, including Colonel Oleg Kuznetsov. The article described vast and extravagant luxuries in the estate.

Mash channel 
On 29 January 2021, the pro-Kremlin Mash Telegram channel gained access to the palace, which showed that the palace was under construction. While it attempted to contradict Navalny's claims, Navalny's team said that it supported their previous reporting that the palace had to be redone due to mold issues.

BBC investigation 

On 13 May 2021, BBC News Russian published its own investigation based on official documents of the sale and meeting notes.

Gallery

See also
 2021 Russian protests
 Mezhyhirya Residence, the residence of Viktor Yanukovych, former Prime Minister and President of Ukraine
 Millerhof
 Novo-Ogaryovo, the official residence of the President of Russia

References

External links
 
 

2005 establishments in Russia
Buildings and structures in Krasnodar Krai
Corruption in Russia
Political controversies in Russia
Hotels in Russia
Italianate architecture in Russia
Palaces in Russia
Vladimir Putin
Buildings and structures completed in 2005
Arkady Rotenberg
Internet memes introduced from Russia
Internet memes introduced in 2021